is a Japanese football player currently playing for Thespakusatsu Gunma, on loan from Blaublitz Akita.

Career
Hayate Take joined J3 League club Fukushima United FC in 2018. After two solid seasons with the Fukushima-based club, he joined Kataller Toyama for the 2020 season.

Club statistics
Updated to 3 December 2022.

References

External links

Profile at Fukushima United FC
Profile at Toyama
Profile at Akita

1995 births
Living people
Waseda University alumni
Association football people from Kanagawa Prefecture
Japanese footballers
J2 League players
J3 League players
Fukushima United FC players
Kataller Toyama players
Blaublitz Akita players
Association football forwards